Planocarina is a genus of arcellinid testate amoebae belonging to the family Hyalospheniidae. It was created in 2016 to agglutinate a clade of species that were previously assigned to the paraphyletic genus Nebela. All species of Planocarina have a compressed keel surrounding the posterior part of their shell. It is the sister group of Alabasta.

Morphology
Members of Planocarina have an elongated, pyriform test with a distinct neck, and lateral margins tapering towards the test opening. The posterior part of the test is surrounded entirely by a flat keel. The test hyaline or slightly yellowish in color, composed of circular and elongated scales recycled from the organism's prey, such as euglyphid testate amoeba.

Classification
Planocarina contains all former species of Nebela that have a flat keel, with the exception of those that have a lateral horn, which are assigned to Cornutheca. There are 4 species in total:
Planocarina carinata  (=Nebela carinata )
Planocarina marginata  (=Nebela marginata )
Planocarina maxima  (=Nebela maxima )
Planocarina spumosa  (=Nebela spumosa )

References

Tubulinea
Amoebozoa genera